Arthur George Rust Jr. (October 13, 1927 – January 12, 2010) was a successful sports broadcaster for half a century. He was also a sports historian and author.  He was considered by many to have been the godfather of sports talk radio.

Career

Broadcaster 
After he graduated from Long Island University, he was hired by WWRL Radio in Woodside, Queens in September 1954  . He began in their merchandising department, but within two months he got on the air. At WWRL, Rust hosted the Schaefer Circle of Sports for 14 years, becoming one of the first African American  sportcasters. At WWRL, Rust interviewed sports icons such as Hank Aaron and Sonny Liston. A music lover, Rust mixed up shows with interviews with artists like James Brown and Miles Davis, who was also a close friend.

In 1967, Rust landed a position as a sports announcer for NBC-TV.  After some six years with NBC, Rust decided to return to the radio. He went on to work as sports director for WMCA, and as a sportscaster and commentator for WINS radio.

In 1981, he signed on with WABC for his "Sportstalk" show. He interviewed everyone from Joe DiMaggio to Muhammad Ali, Sugar Ray Robinson and one of his idols, sportscaster Red Barber.

Writer 
Rust had been a columnist for The New York Amsterdam News and the Daily News; he was also an author.

His first book, the controversially titled Get that Nigger off the Field, published in 1976, explores the rocky beginnings of blacks in baseball. Other books include Joe Louis, My Life (1978), a collaboration with the Brown Bomber; Recollections of a Baseball Junkie (1985) in which Rust waxes poetically about his life; Art Rust's Illustrated History of the Black Athlete which celebrates greats such as Jessie Owens and Althea Gibson; and Darryl with Darryl Strawberry (1992).

He collaborated  with his wife Edna on several of these books prior to her death in 1986. Devastated by the loss, for years after, Rust delivered a "Goodnight Edna baby," at the end of each "Sportstalk" broadcast. After some time he found a partner in Patty Murphy and remarried in 1991. He was the father of Suzanne Rust, a writer based in New York, and grandfather to her two young children.

Later career 
Rust worked with New York's WBLS Radio from 1991 to 1994, but the last few years found him working selectively. He was a contributor for Black Issues Book Review and kept up with the world of sports through books, newspapers and his friends in the business. His favorite pastimes were doting on his two grandchildren and listening to his extensive collection of jazz records.

Rust died on January 12, 2010.

Selected works 
 Rust, Art Jr., "Get That Nigger Off the Field!": A Sparkling, Informal History of the Black Man in baseball, 1976
 Rust, Art Jr; Rust, Edna; Louis, Joe, Joe Louis: My Life, 1978
 Rust, Art Jr., Baseball Quiz Book, 1985
 Rust, Art Jr.; Rust, Edna, Art Rust's Illustrated History of the Black athlete, 1985
 Rust, Art Jr.; Rust, Edna, Recollections of a Baseball Junkie, 1985
 Rust, Art Jr., Legends: Conversations with Baseball Greats, 1989
 Rust, Art Jr.; Strawberry, Darryl, Darryl 1992

References

1927 births
2010 deaths
African-American sports journalists
American sports journalists
American sports radio personalities
American television sports announcers
Major League Baseball broadcasters
Sportspeople from New York City
20th-century African-American people
21st-century African-American people